Nana Kwaku Boateng I was a former Omanhene of New Juaben. He led the revolt against the Golden Stool of Ashanti during the reign of Nana Dokua. He ruled the New Juabens (sometimes called Dwaben) from 1913 to 1930. Nana Kwaku had a son called Asafo Adjei who married the Queen of Juaben called Sapoma. He usurped the stool of Juaben after her death which contradicts the traditional usage of the matrilineal system of succession.

History of New Juaben 
New Juaben was established by Asante refugees. In and around 1875, the war between Juaben in Ashanti and the others in Ashanti resulted in the migration of the Juabenhene and some of his people to the current Eastern region. They settled in the area around Koforidua and established New Juaben. This land was by Nana Asafo Agyei who was the Omanhene then, followed by his people to New Juaben.

References 

African monarchs
19th-century monarchs in Africa
19th-century births
20th-century deaths
Year of birth unknown
Year of death unknown